Lonnie Robertson  (January 8, 1908 in Longrun, Missouri – 1981) was an American musician, singer and composer

Born in Missouri, Robertson was recognized for his skill as a fiddle player.  He also played guitar and mandolin, sang, and composed fiddle tunes.  They also printed and sold song books. .

Robertson recorded many of his tunes from the 1960s to 1981, often on Caney Mountain Records.  He and his wife Thelma played on radio station KWTO  in Springfield, Missouri, for a number of years.

References

External links
 findagrave
 Rounder Records
 Kansas City Old-Time Music

American fiddlers
People from Ozark County, Missouri
Musicians from Missouri
1981 deaths
1908 births
Old-time fiddlers
20th-century American violinists